Hamidur Rahman (1928 – 19 November 1988) was a Bangladeshi artist and sculptor. He is best known as the architect of the Shaheed Minar, a national monument in Dhaka, Bangladesh, established to commemorate the martyrs of the Language Movement of 1952.

Gallery

Death 

Hamidur Rahman died on November 19, 1988 in Montreal, Canada.

References

1928 births
1988 deaths
Bangladeshi sculptors
Bengali male artists
20th-century sculptors
Recipients of the Ekushey Padak in arts